(Japan > Yamaguchi Prefecture > Asa District)

 was a district located in Yamaguchi Prefecture.

See also
List of dissolved districts of Japan

References

Asa District